Caravan is a jazz album released by Art Blakey and the Jazz Messengers in February 1963. It was Blakey's first album for Riverside Records after he signed with them in October 1962. The songs were recorded at the Plaza Sound Studio in New York City, on October 23–24, 1962 The producer was Orrin Keepnews who also supervised the album's remastered re-release on CD.

In 2007, the BBC described it as "a slick, fluid, professional set of hard bop at its finest".

Track listing 
 "Caravan" (Juan Tizol) - 9:47
 "Sweet 'n' Sour" (Shorter) - 5:31
 "In the Wee Small Hours of the Morning" (Mann, Hilliard) - 4:06
 "This Is for Albert" (Shorter) - 8:21
 "Skylark" (Carmichael, Mercer) - 4:51
 "Thermo" (Hubbard) - 6:48

The remastered CD re-issue features two alternate takes, each preceding its master take.
"Thermo (Take 2)" (Hubbard) - 7:26
"Sweet 'n' Sour (Take 4)" (Shorter) - 5:27

Personnel 
 Art Blakey - drums
 Freddie Hubbard - trumpet
 Curtis Fuller - trombone
 Wayne Shorter - tenor saxophone
 Cedar Walton - piano
 Reggie Workman - bass

References 

Art Blakey albums
The Jazz Messengers albums
Albums produced by Orrin Keepnews
1963 albums
Riverside Records albums